{{DISPLAYTITLE:C30H48O3}}
The molecular formula C30H48O3 (molar mass: 456.70 g/mol) can represent the following compounds: 

 Oleanolic acid, a pentacyclic triterpenoid commonly found in Olea europaea (olives) and their oils.
 Ursolic acid, a pentacyclic triterpenoid
 Lucidadiol, a sterol

References